Severe Tropical Storm Cecil in May of 1989 caused devastating floods in central Vietnam, killing 751 people. The storm developed as a tropical depression over the South China Sea on May 22. The storm made landfall near Hoi An, Vietnam early on May 25 and quickly weakened. The system later dissipated over Laos on May 26.

Widespread structural and agricultural losses took place in addition to the significant loss of life, with damage estimated at ₫300 billion ($71.7 million). In the wake of the flooding, some international aid was sent to Vietnam, though most relief work was conducted by the nation's government, local agencies, and the Red Cross.

Meteorological history

On May 20, following Typhoon Brenda's passage through the South China Sea, a monsoon trough extending from the area into the Bay of Bengal received enhanced low-level southwesterly flow. An environment of weak wind shear in the wake of the typhoon allowed a new area of low pressure to form within the southwesterly flow on May 21. With convection becoming persistent and the system's overall presentation more organized by May 22, the JTWC issued a Tropical Cyclone Formation Alert at 0300 UTC. Around this time, the Japan Meteorological Agency (JMA) classified the system as a tropical depression. Later that day, convection wrapped entirely around the center of circulation; this structural improvement, combined with nearby surface observations, prompted the JTWC to designate the system as Tropical Storm Cecil.

Initially, Cecil was forecast to maintain a northward track into a weakness in a subtropical ridge left behind by Typhoon Brenda; however, Cecil turned westward on May 23 due to another ridge over China. With favorable atmospheric conditions, Cecil continued to intensify through May 24. The storm ultimately attained peak winds of  while situated just off the coast of central Vietnam. Once onshore, Cecil quickly weakened to a tropical depression. Turning slightly to the west-northwest, the remnants of Cecil continued inland before dissipating over eastern Laos early on May 26.

Impact and aftermath
In addition to the considerable losses that took place in Vietnam, Cecil also produced heavy rains in Laos and northeastern Thailand, resulting in flooding and crop damage.

Vietnam
Tropical Storm Cecil was regarded as the worst storm to strike Vietnam in 50 years. In some areas, rainfall exceeded . Approximately 105,600 hectares of rice and other crops were destroyed and another 78,300 hectares were otherwise inundated. About 7,500 metric tons of rice seeds were also lost. The hardest hit areas were in Quảng Nam Province, where damage reached ₫300 billion ($71.7 million). The storm destroyed at least 10,000 homes were destroyed and damaged another 27,000 buildings, leaving an estimated 336,000 people homeless. Approximately 60 percent of the forests and forestry nurseries in the province were ruined. By June 5, 151 people were confirmed dead across the country with another 600 missing. Eventually, the death toll was revised to 751 as all missing persons were considered dead.

In the wake of the storm, Vietnamese soldiers were deployed to rescue survivors. Local police forces were also stepped up to prevent looting. On June 5 government also requested international assistance to deal with the scale of the disaster. However, this was later retracted on June 16, though spontaneous donations were appreciated. The governments of Australia and France provided Vietnam with $75,188 and $73,964 in funds respectively. Additionally, the Swedish Red Cross donated clothing, which was later distributed by the local Red Cross along with medicine and relief supplies. A total of ₫52 million ($124,000) worth of funds and relief supplies, including  of fabric, and two tons of clothing, was sent to Quang Nam province.

See also

1989 Pacific typhoon season
Other tropical cyclones that impacted Vietnam in 1989: 
Typhoon Angela (1989)
Typhoon Dan (1989)
Typhoon Elsie (1989)

Notes

References

External links
Japan Meteorological Agency
Joint Typhoon Warning Center 

1989 Pacific typhoon season
Typhoons in Vietnam
Typhoons in Thailand
Western Pacific severe tropical storms